Baccalà mantecato (Also spelled bacalà mantecato) (meaning "whipped salt cod spread" or "creamed cod") is a Venetian appetizer made with dried cod (stoccafisso, stockfish).

History

Baccalà mantecato was created during the 18th-century in Venice. However, the use of salt cod to Venetian cuisine was first introduced in the 15th-century by  Pietro Querini was shipwrecked on the Norwegian island of Røst. Querini and his crew learned how to salt cod from local fisherman. They brought back stockfish to Venice, helping to popularize the fish. 

In 2001, the city of Venice created the Brotherhood of Baccalà Mantecato to preserve and promote the dish. It is commonly served at Venetian bars and is also a dish families serve at Christmas.

The dish and variations

The recipe uses stockfish, with salt cod being the most common. The simplest version of the recipe consists of the cod, garlic, olive oil, and salt and pepper.   The fish is poached in water or milk with garlic. After poaching, it is deboned, if necessary. The fish is then broken up in a bowl and whipped, with olive oil, into a fluffy texture similar to mousse. Lidia Bastianich adds potato to the fish during the whipping process.

The finished spread may be topped with chopped raw garlic, parsley, white pepper, or nutmeg. Baccalà mantecato is commonly served atop sliced stirato or grilled or pan-fried polenta. One variation on the dish includes poaching with lemon and bay leaf, rather than garlic, while others poach the fish in milk and water.

See also
Brandade

References

External links

"The First ‘Fish’ in This Year’s Feast Is a Creamy Appetizer" from Saveur

 
Cuisine of Veneto